Angel Tears is a fusion musical duo based in Tel Aviv, Israel, composed of Sebastian Taylor, aka Shakta, and Momi Ochion.

Background
Angel Tears consists of Momi Ochion (Israel) and Sebastian Taylor (UK). Ochion, whose roots lie in Israeli pop and world fusion music, is the melody man of the duo. Sebastian James Taylor, who composes and performs much of the material, lives in London and is known for his work with the electronic groups Kaya Project, Shakta, and Digitalis. Other members include various vocalists.

Angel Tears' music spans the genres of world electronica and new-age spiritual. The duo use a wide variety of rhythms, from electronic beats to Bedouin darbuka and other indigenous drums. The music ranges from club-oriented to tribal. Asian and Middle Eastern vocals are a frequent component, and instruments include Tibetan flutes, Indian sitar, Arabian violin, Middle Eastern horns, grand piano, electric guitar, and synthesizers.

The duo have tracks on many global fusion compilations, including Buddha Bar 2, Buddha Bar 8, and Lotus Lounge. Their music can also heard on popular TV shows, including Sex and the City, Third Watch, and The West Wing. Angel Tears have released four albums to date.

Discography
Albums
 Way of the Mystic, Vol. 1 (1998)
 Harmony, Vol. 2 (2001)
 The Dreaming, Vol. 3 (2002)
 Vision, Vol. 4 (2004)

References

External links
 Angel Tears on LoveCat Music (archived page)

Israeli musical duos